Cogent may refer to:

 CoGeNT, a type of detector for weakly interacting massive particles
 Cogent Communications, an Internet service provider
 Cogent Inc., a provider of automated fingerprint identification systems
 Cogent Partners, an investment banking firm focused on private equity secondary advisory transactions
 A group of Open Access journals operated by Taylor and Francis